Violin Sonata No. 1 may refer to:

 Violin Sonata No. 1 (Beethoven)
 Violin Sonata No. 1 (Bloch)
 Violin Sonata No. 1 (Brahms)
 Violin Sonata No. 1 (Fauré)
 Violin Sonata No. 1 (Grieg)
 Violin Sonata No. 1 (Ives) by Charles Ives
 Violin Sonata No. 1 (Mozart)
 Violin Sonata No. 1 (Prokofiev)
 Violin Sonata No. 1 (Saint-Saëns)
 Violin Sonata No. 1 (Schumann)
 Violin Sonata No. 1 (Stanford)
 Violin Sonata No. 1 (Ysaÿe)